Rock Whore vs. Dance Floor is a remix album by Chemlab, released on March 14, 2006 by Invisible Records and Underground, Inc.

Track listing

Personnel
Adapted from the Rock Whore vs. Dance Floor liner notes.

Chemlab
 F.J. DeSanto – instruments
 Jamie Duffy – instruments
 Jared Louche – vocals, instruments
 Greg Lucas – instruments
 Jason Novak – instruments

Additional performers
 Duncan Wilkinson – additional programming (1)

Production and design
 Martin Atkins – mastering
 Michael Doyle – design
 Miguel Torres – mastering

Release history

References

External links 
 Rock Whore vs. Dance Floor at Discogs (list of releases)

Chemlab albums
2006 compilation albums
Invisible Records remix albums
Underground, Inc. remix albums